HMS Nassau was a 70-gun third rate ship of the line of the Royal Navy, built at Portsmouth Dockyard and launched on 9 January 1706.

Orders were issued on 25 May 1736 directing Nassau to be taken to pieces and rebuilt according to the 1733 proposals of the 1719 Establishment at Chatham, from where she was relaunched on 25 September 1740.

In February 1747 Nassau was listed as under the command of Captain Holcombe. In May of that year, Nassau captured on passage from Corsica to Genoa two troop transports carrying 210 Spanish and French soldiers and officers.

In 1758 she participated in the British Capture of Senegal, captained by Captain James Sayer.

Nassau was sold out of the navy in 1770.

Notes

References

Lavery, Brian (2003) The Ship of the Line - Volume 1: The development of the battlefleet 1650-1850. Conway Maritime Press. .

Ships of the line of the Royal Navy
1700s ships